Trust Me: Short Stories is a collection of 19 works of short fiction by John Updike. Each story originally appeared in The New Yorker or other literary journals. The stories were collected in 1987 by Alfred A. Knopf.

Stories

The stories in the collection first appeared in The New Yorker, unless otherwise indicated.

"Trust Me" (July 16, 1979)
"More Stately Mansions" (Esquire, October 1982)
"Still of Some Use" (October 6, 1980)
"The Lovely Troubled Daughters of Our Old Crowd" (April 6, 1981)
"Pygmalion" (The Atlantic Monthly, July 1981)
"The City" (November 16, 1981)
"Learn a Trade" (December 28, 1981)
"The Ideal Village" (Ontario Review 17, Fall-Winter 1982-83)
"Deaths of Distant Friends" (June 7, 1982)
"The Other" (August 15, 1983)
"One More Interview" (July 4, 1983)
"Slippage" (February 20, 1984)
"Poker Night" (Esquire, August 1984)
"Made in Heaven" (The Atlantic Monthly, April, 1985)
"Getting Into the Set" (Vanity Fair, October 1984)
"The Wallet" Yankee, September, 1985)
"The Other Woman" (December 23, 1985)
"Beautiful Husbands" (Playboy, January 1987)
"Leaf Season" (October 13, 1986)

Critical assessment
Literary critic Marilynne Robinson at the The New York Times writes:

Literary scholar Robert M. Luscher notes a stylistic shift in Trust Me in that “the highly adjectival style has been replaced with a slightly leaner one that accentuates his poetic precision and makes it even more evident that his command of the language exceeds that of most of his contemporaries.”

Theme
Updike’s “thematic concern with trust” is an examination of mostly middle-aged or elderly New England suburbanites who are “increasingly conscious of death, aging and illness.” Literary critic Robert M. Luscher writes:

The dust jacket, portraying 19th Century artist  Picart’s The Fall of Icarus (1731) was selected by Updike and is consistent with the volume’s theme. Critic Robert M. Lischer writes: “While Daedalus has instructed his son to [use his wings] prudently, Icarus betrays his trust, succumbing to the temptation to soar close to the sun…Updike has provided an appropriate mythological parallel before we even open the first story, since these issues— broken trust, family bonds, the fragile nature of promises, and our inevitable falls— are central to the stories within.”

Footnotes

Sources 
Luscher, Robert M. 1993. John Updike: A Study of the Short Fiction. Twayne Publishers, New York. 
Carduff, Christopher.  2013. Ref. 2  Note on the Texts in John Updike: Collected Early Stories. Christopher Carduff, editor. The Library of America. pp. 948-958 
 Robinson, Marilynne. 1987. At Play in the Backyard of the Psyche. The New York Times, Book Review Desk. https://archive.nytimes.com/www.nytimes.com/books/97/04/06/lifetimes/updike-trustme.html Retrieved 06 March, 2023.

1987 short story collections
Short story collections by John Updike
Alfred A. Knopf books